Idaho Transfer is a 1973 science fiction film directed by Peter Fonda. It stars Kelley Bohanon, Kevin Hearst, Dale Hopkins, and Keith Carradine.

It is the only film Fonda directed in which he did not appear.

Plot summary
Teenager Karen Braden (Kelley Bohanon) is a troubled mental hospital outpatient who is taken by her father George and sister Isa to a government facility near the Craters of the Moon lava fields in Idaho. The project there was commissioned to develop matter transference, but made a different discovery: time travel. They also discovered that a mysterious ecological catastrophe will soon wipe out civilization.

The time travel process has negative health effects, though. Adults "not much older than 20" are unable to survive for long, as their kidneys hemorrhage shortly after the experience. So the scientists decide to only send young people 56 years into the future so they can build a new civilization.

After the government takes over the project, the transfer machines are turned off, trapping a large number of project members in the future.  Now trapped, they begin exploring the future world.
The last survivor from the project is picked up by a family dressed in futuristic clothing.  She is placed alive in the trunk of their car, to be used as fuel. The small girl in the back seat asks what will happen when they run out of them (people from the past),
"Will we have to use each other, then?"

Cast
Kelley Bohanon as Karen Braden
Kevin Hearst as Ronald
Caroline Hildebrand as Isa Braden
Keith Carradine as Arthur
Ted D'Arms as George Braden
Judy Motulsky as Judy (as Judy Motolsky)
Dale Hopkins as Leslie
Fred Seagraves as Dr. Lewis
Joe Newman as Cleve
Susan Kelly as Nurse Nora
Meridith Hull as Jennifer
Roy B. Ayers as Elgin (as Roy Ayers)
Kim Casper as Anne
Debbie Scott as Joanna
Devin Burke as Michael
Earl Crabb as Evans

Production
The film was produced by Peter Fonda's Pando Company, in association with
Marrianne Santas; it was copyrighted to Kathleen Film Production Company in 1973.

The $500,000 film was self-financed by Fonda and starred mostly non-professional actors. Principal shooting took place in Arco, Idaho, Craters of the Moon National Monument and Preserve, and Bruneau Sand Dunes State Park. Castmember Earl Crabb also cites Bellevue, Washington as a location. The film was shot after Fonda had finished directing The Hired Hand (1971) and August 1971.

The end credits conclude with the Latin phrase "Esto Perpetua".  Translated, it means "Let it be perpetual" or "It is forever"; appropriate for a time travel film, it is also the motto of the state of Idaho. Fonda either neglected, or did not wish to renew his rights on this film, and according to several sources, the movie passed into Public Domain.

Fonda also produced a documentary about the making of the film.

Reception
Fonda said "The film was in release for only three weeks when the distributor (Cinemation) went bankrupt. The banks had the film for years. Luckily, I was able to retain the rights."

Reception of Idaho Transfer has been mixed. Time described it as a "very deliberate and closely controlled film graced with a slow, severe beauty that makes its quiet edge of panic all the more chilling", whereas Jay Robert Nash in The Motion Picture Guide declares it a "useless piece of drivel about an obnoxious group of teens".

While the film's unprofessional acting is pointed out by nearly all critics, its overall naturalist technique was praised at the time.

Notes and references

See also
 List of American films of 1973

External links
 
 
 "Terminal Station" Time review by Jay Cocks (December 3, 1973)
 Idaho Transfer in-depth review at Million Monkey Theater

1973 films
1970s science fiction films
1970s dystopian films
Films directed by Peter Fonda
Films set in Idaho
American post-apocalyptic films
Films about time travel
American science fiction films
Films scored by Bruce Langhorne
1970s English-language films
1970s American films